Longcang Township (Mandarin: 龙藏乡, pinyin: Lóngzàng Xiāng) also known as Longzang Township is a township under the jurisdiction of Xinghai County, Hainan Tibetan Autonomous Prefecture, Qinghai, China. Longcang Township's is bordered by Zhongtie Township to its east, Maqên County and Qimuqu River to its south, Wenquan Township to its west and Qushi'an town to its north. In 2010, Longcang Township had a total population of 5,916 people: 3,010 males and 2,906 females: 1,844 under 14 years old, 3,782 aged between 15 and 64 and 290 over 65 years old. Longcang Township has jurisdiction over the following villages:

 Sairiba Village
 Langqing Village
 Sangshidou Village
 Muguo Village
 Marimao Village
 Rixu Village
 Nadong Village

References 

Township-level divisions of Qinghai
Hainan Tibetan Autonomous Prefecture